Joseph Arthur Prud'Homme (March 12, 1898 – January 7, 1978) was a Canadian middleweight boxer who competed in the early 1920s.

He won a silver medal at the 1920 Summer Olympics, losing to British boxer Harry Mallin in the final. Prud'Homme later moved to Plamondon, Alberta and died in Athabasca, Alberta in 1978.

Olympic record
Here is Georges Prud'Hommes' record at the 1920 Antwerp Olympics where he competed as a middleweight boxer:

 Round of 16: defeated Antoine Masson (Belgium)
 Quarterfinal: defeated Marcel Rey-Golliet (France)
 Semifinal: defeated Hjalmar Strømme (Norway)
 Final: lost to Harry Mallin (Great Britain); Prud'Homme awarded the silver medal

References

External links
Georges Prud'Homme's profile at databaseOlympics 

1898 births
1978 deaths
Canadian military personnel of World War I
Canadian soldiers
Sportspeople from Ottawa
Middleweight boxers
Olympic boxers of Canada
Boxers at the 1920 Summer Olympics
Olympic silver medalists for Canada
Olympic medalists in boxing
Boxing people from Ontario
Medalists at the 1920 Summer Olympics
Canadian male boxers